San Juan, Puerto Rico, held an election for mayor on November 4, 2008. Among other elections, it was held concurrently with the 2008 Puerto Rico gubernatorial election. It saw the reelection incumbent mayor Jorge Santini, a member of the New Progressive Party, to a third consecutive term.

Results

See also
2008 Puerto Rican general election

References

2008
San Juan, Puerto Rico mayoral
San Juan, Puerto Rico